Dictyopteridium is an extinct genus of plants belonging to Glossopteridaceae, but the name is used only for compression fossils of elongate multiovulate reproductive structures adnate to Glossopteris leaves. Permineralized remains identical to Dictyopteridium have been referred to the organ genus Homevaleia

Description 
Dictyopteridium is an elongate leaf-like structure adnate to the upper surface of ordinary-appearing leaves of Glossopteris. It bore numerous ovules on its lower side which was folded over and filled with mucilage cells. Pollen still found its way into the pollen chambers of these protected seeds, and fertilization was by utilizing motile sperm with helical cilial bands.

Whole plant associations 
Permineralzed remains from the Late Permian Blackwater Coal Measures near Homevale Station, Queensland is evidence that the following paleobotanical organ genera were part of the same plant species: Dictyopteridium sporiferum impression of ovulate structure, Homevaleia gouldii permineralized ovulate structure, Glossopteris communis impressions of leaves, Eretmonia hinjridaensis pollen organ, Protohaploxypinus limpidus pollen, Araucarioxylon bengalense wood, and  Vertebraria australis chambered roots.

References

Pteridospermatophyta
Permian plants
Prehistoric plant genera
Lopingian first appearances
Lopingian genus extinctions